Wijaya Putra University is a university in Surabaya, Indonesia, established in 1981.

Alumni 

 Gatot Sudjito
 Makmur HAPK

References

External links
 

Universities in Indonesia
Universities in East Java
Educational institutions in Surabaya
Educational institutions established in 1981
1981 establishments in Indonesia